This is a list of Turkish football transfers for the 2015–16 winter transfer window by club. Only transfers of clubs in the Süper Lig are included.

The winter transfer window opened on 1 January 2016, although a few transfers took place prior to that date. The window closed at midnight on 2 February 2016. Players without a club may join one at any time, either during or in between transfer windows.

Süper Lig

Akhisar Belediyespor

In:

Out:

Antalyaspor

In:

Out:

Beşiktaş

In:

Out:

Bursaspor

In:

Out:

Çaykur Rizespor

In:

Out:

Eskişehirspor

In:

Out:

Fenerbahçe

In:

Out:

Galatasaray

In:

Out:

Gaziantepspor

In:

Out:

Gençlerbirliği

In:

Out:

İstanbul Başakşehir

In:

Out:

Kasımpaşa

In:

Out:

Kayserispor

In:

Out:

Torku Konyaspor

In:

Out:

Mersin İdmanyurdu

In:

Out:

Osmanlıspor

In:

Out:

Sivasspor

In:

Out:

Trabzonspor

In:

Out:

References

Transfers
Turkey
2015–16